The 2023 Supercopa do Brasil de Futebol Feminino (officially the Supercopa Feminina Betano 2023 for sponsorship reasons) was the second edition of the Supercopa do Brasil de Futebol Feminino football competition. It was held between 4 and 12 February 2023.

Corinthians defeated Flamengo/Marinha 4–1 in the final to win their 2nd title.

Qualified teams
The competition was contested by 8 teams. The teams were chosen between the top twelve teams of the 2022 Campeonato Brasileiro de Futebol Feminino Série A1 and the top four teams of the 2022 Campeonato Brasileiro de Futebol Feminino Série A2 choosing only one team for state. If necessary, a state would gain a second berth according to its 2023 Women's State CBF Ranking position.

Teams in bold qualified for the competition.

Format
The teams played a single-elimination tournament. All stages were played on a single-leg basis, with the highest-ranked-federation team in the 2023 Women's State Ranking hosting the leg. If the teams belonged to the same federation the highest-ranked team in the 2023 Women's Club Ranking would host the leg. If tied, the penalty shoot-out would be used to determine the winners.

Draw
The draw was held on 17 January 2023, 15:30 at CBF headquarters in Rio de Janeiro. The 8 qualified teams were drawn in a single group (2023 Women's Club Ranking shown in parentheses). 

To determine the home teams, the 2023 Women's State Ranking of the participants is:

Bracket

Quarter-finals

|}

Group A

Group B

Group C

Group D

Semi-finals

|}

Group E

Group F

Final

|}

Group G

References

2023 in Brazilian football